The Roman Catholic Church in Rwanda is composed of 1 ecclesiastical territory with 7 suffragan dioceses.

List of dioceses
Metropolitan Archdiocese of Kigali
Diocese of Butare
Diocese of Cyangugu
Diocese of Gikongoro
Diocese of Kabgayi
Diocese of Kibungo
Diocese of Nyundo
Diocese of Ruhengeri
Diocese of Byumba

External links 
Catholic-Hierarchy entry.
GCatholic.org.

Rwanda
Catholic dioceses